M & O Chevrolet Company is a historic Chevrolet automobile showroom and service center located at Fayetteville, Cumberland County, North Carolina. It was designed by architect Frank Benton and built between 1934 and 1937. It is a one-story, Art Deco style building.  It has an expansive barrel-vaulted service center and features a vertical central tower and stepped roofline.

It was listed on the National Register of Historic Places in 1983.

References

Commercial buildings on the National Register of Historic Places in North Carolina
Art Deco architecture in North Carolina
Commercial buildings completed in 1937
Buildings and structures in Fayetteville, North Carolina
National Register of Historic Places in Cumberland County, North Carolina